Hamid Reza Derakhshan (born 23 January 1959) is an Iranian former professional football player and now manager who last managed Saipa in Azadegan League.

Derakhshan played as a midfielder for a number of clubs, most notably Persepolis as well as the Iran national team. He played a total of twelve years at Persepolis and also played five years at Qatar SC and Al-Sadd. After his retirement as a player, he became manager of Persepolis, managed team from 1994 to 1995 and 1997. He later managed other Iranian clubs like Rah Ahan, Paykan, Shahrdari Tabriz, Shahin Bushehr and Damash Gilan. In September 2014, he returned as manager of Persepolis, after he served as club's technical manager.

Club career
Born in Tehran, Iran, Derakhshan started his club career with Persepolis. After playing ten years for Persepolis, he left the club for Qatar where he joined Qatar SC for which he played for four years followed by one season in Al-Sadd. Although he played for Persepolis on loan during 1990 Asian Cup Winners' Cup when Persepolis won the title. He returned to Persepolis and played his last two years at Persepolis before retiring in 1994.

International career
Derakhshan was a member of the Iran national under-20 football team at 1977 FIFA World Youth Championship. He played for Iran national team at 1980 AFC Asian Cup, 1982 Asian Games, 1984 AFC Asian Cup, 1986 Asian Games. He was captain of Iran at ECO Cup in 1993 and 1994 FIFA World Cup Qualifications.

International goals
Scores and results list Iran's goal tally first, score column indicates score after each Derakhshan goal.

Coaching career

Derakhshan started his coaching career as coach of Persepolis in 1995. He also coached Iran U20 national team in 2001 but was sacked after it was discovered that he had been using overage players in his teams. He also briefly acted as an assistant coach to Branko Ivankovic in 2002.

He was the technical manager of Persepolis from 2004 until 2008 and Paykan in 2008–09 season. He became the head coach of Paykan in summer 2009. He was appointed as Shahrdari Tabriz's head coach on 10 October 2010 and was sacked by club on 19 June 2011. He was appointed as Shahin Bushehr's head coach on 26 June 2011. He resigned on 5 October 2011 but was re-signed by Shahin on 13 February 2012. He resigned again after a series of the problem in the club that led team in the relegation zone and losing 2012 Hazfi Cup Final. On 21 September 2012, he was signed as new head coach of Damash Gilan but was sacked on 3 March 2013 after a series of poor results.

On 10 September 2014, Derakhshan became manager of Persepolis, replacing sacked Ali Daei. However, he resigned on 5 April 2015 after a poor run of results.

Honours

As a player
Persepolis
 Tehran Provincial League: 1983, 1985, 1987
 Asian Cup Winners' Cup: 1990

Iran
 AFC Asian Cup: third place 1980, fourth place 1984
 ECO Cup: 1993

As a manager
Shahin Bushehr
 Hazfi Cup: runner-up 2011–12

References

External links 

 Hamid Derakhshan at TeamMelli.com
 

1957 births
Association football midfielders
Iran international footballers
Iranian expatriate footballers
Iranian football managers
Iranian footballers
Living people
Sportspeople from Tehran
Persepolis F.C. players
Persepolis F.C. managers
Damash Gilan managers
Qatar SC players
Al Sadd SC players
Paykan F.C. managers
Shahin Bushehr F.C. managers
1980 AFC Asian Cup players
1984 AFC Asian Cup players
Footballers at the 1986 Asian Games
Footballers at the 1982 Asian Games
Qatar Stars League players
Asian Games competitors for Iran
Persian Gulf Pro League managers